Parinari canarioides is a tree in the family Chrysobalanaceae. The specific epithet  is for the species' resemblance to the genus Canarium.

Description
The dark red-brown bark is smooth, occasionally fissured.

Distribution and habitat
Parinari canarioides grows naturally in Sumatra, Borneo, the Philippines and Sulawesi. Its habitat is mixed dipterocarp forests from sea-level to  altitude.

References

canarioides
Trees of Sumatra
Trees of Borneo
Trees of the Philippines
Trees of Sulawesi
Plants described in 1955